Jerry Doerger (born Jerome William Doerger) is a former center in the National Football League (NFL). Doerger was drafted in the eighth round of the 1982 NFL Draft by the Chicago Bears and played that season with the team. He would later play with the Orlando Renegades of the United States Football League (USFL) during the 1985 USFL season before again playing in the NFL with the San Diego Chargers during the 1985 NFL season.  Jerry was initiated into the Alpha Xi chapter of Pi Kappa Alpha in the spring of 2011.

References

Chicago Bears players
San Diego Chargers players
American football centers
Wisconsin Badgers football players
1960 births
Living people
Players of American football from Cincinnati